Pilocrocis synomotis is a moth in the family Crambidae. It was described by Edward Meyrick in 1894. It is found on Sulawesi in Indonesia.

References

Pilocrocis
Moths described in 1894
Moths of Indonesia